The 2017–18 season was the 50th season of the Northern Premier League Premier Division, and the eleventh and last season of the Division One North and South. 
The league sponsors for 2017–18 were Evo-Stik.

Premier Division

Team changes
The following 6 clubs left the Premier Division before the season -
 Blyth Spartans – promoted to National League North
 Corby Town – relegated to NPL Division One South
 Frickley Athletic – relegated to NPL Division One South
 Ilkeston – relegated to NPL Division One South, and were subsequently wound up in the high court. A New Ilkeston Town Replaced in Midland League Division One.
 Skelmersdale United – relegated to NPL Division One North
 Spennymoor Town – promoted to National League North

The following 6 clubs joined the Premier Division before the season -
Altrincham – relegated from National League North
Farsley Celtic – promoted from NPL Division One North
Lancaster City – promoted from NPL Division One North
Shaw Lane – promoted from NPL Division One South
Stalybridge Celtic – relegated from National League North
Witton Albion – promoted from NPL Division One South

League table

Top scorers
Up to games played 28 April 2018.

Results

Play-offs

Semi-finals

Final

Stadia and locations

Division One North

Team changes
The following 3 clubs left Division One North before the season -
Burscough – relegated to North West Counties League Premier Division
Farsley Celtic – promoted to NPL Premier Division
Lancaster City – promoted to NPL Premier Division

The following 3 clubs joined Division One North before the season -
Atherton Collieries – promoted from North West Counties League Premier Division
Skelmersdale United – relegated from NPL Premier Division
South Shields – promoted from Northern League Division One

League table

Top scorers
Up to games played 28 April 2018.

Results

Play-offs

Semi-finals

Final

Stadia and locations

Division One South

Team changes
The following 5 clubs left Division One South before the season -
Northwich Victoria – relegated to North West Counties League Premier Division
Rugby Town – relegated to Midland League Premier Division
Shaw Lane – promoted to NPL Premier Division
Witton Albion – promoted to NPL Premier Division
AFC Rushden & Diamonds – transferred to Southern League Division One Central

The following 5 clubs joined Division One South before the season -
Alvechurch – promoted from the Midland League Premier Division
Cleethorpes Town – promoted from the Northern Counties East League Premier Division
Corby Town – relegated from NPL Premier Division
Frickley Athletic – relegated from NPL Premier Division
Peterborough Sports – promoted from United Counties League Premier Division

League table

Top scorers
Up to games played 28 April 2018.

Results

Play-offs

Semi-finals

Final

Stadia and locations

Challenge Cup

The 2017–18 Northern Premier League Challenge Cup, known as the 17–18 Integro Doodson League Cup for sponsorship reasons, was the 48th season of the Northern Premier League Challenge Cup, the main cup competition in the Northern Premier League. It was sponsored by Doodson Sport for a seventh consecutive season. 67 clubs from England and one from Wales entered the competition, beginning with the Preliminary Round, and all ties ended after 90 minutes and concluded with penalties.

The defending champions were Bamber Bridge, who defeated Grantham Town in the 2017 final and who lost to the eventual champions Atherton Collieries in the second round.

Calendar

Preliminary round

First round

Second round

Third round

Quarter-finals

Semi-finals

Final

Level 6 & 7 Summary

Level 6 Summary 2017-18

Level 7 Summary 2017-18 
Note: Corinthian-Casuals were promoted as the Level 8 play-off final loser with the highest PPG, after Thurrock's resignation from the Isthmian Premier Division.

See also
Northern Premier League
2017–18 Isthmian League
2017–18 Southern League

References

External links
Official website

Northern Premier League seasons
7